The 2022–23 Bangladesh Premier League is the 15th season of the Bangladesh Premier League since its establishment in 2007. A total of 11 football clubs are competing in the league. The country's top-flight football competition is being played on 9 December 2022–22 July 2023.

Bashundhara Kings are the defending champions.

Rule changes from last season
 A club can sign maximum of five foreigners including at least one player who hails from an AFC affiliated nation. However the AFC "3+1" foreign players rule (three players of any nationality and one from an AFC MA) will be in effect during the match.

Teams
Eleven teams are competing in the league – the top nine teams from the previous season and the two teams promoted from the BCL. The promoted teams are AFC Uttara and Fortis FC, who are new to the top flight. They replaced Swadhinata KS and Uttar Baridhara Club (both teams relegated after just one year back in the top flight).

Changes

 Saif Sporting Club decided to quit from all kinds of football activities from the 2022–23 season due to financial reasons, resulting their exclusion from BPL.

Stadiums and locations

Personnel and kits

Coaching changes

Foreign players

Bold names refer to players who have senior international cap(s) for their respective nations.
Note :: players who released during summer transfer window;: players who registered during summer transfer window.

League table

Results

Results table

Positions by round
The following table lists the positions of teams after each week of matches. In order to preserve the chronological evolution, any postponed matches are not included to the round at which they were originally scheduled but added to the full round they were played immediately afterward.

Results by games

Season statistics

Goalscorers

Own goals 
† Bold Club indicates winner of the match

Hat-tricks

Most Assists

Most Goal Contributions

Clean Sheets

Discipline

Player 

 Most yellow cards: 6
 Otabek Valijonov (Sheikh Jamal DC)

 Most red cards: 1
 Mohamed Sohel Rana (Dhaka Abahani)
 Noyon Mia (Rahmatganj MFS)
 Sohel Rana (Bashundhara Kings)
 Rayhan Ahmed (AFC Uttara)
 Pappu Hossain (Chittagong Abahani)

Club 

 Yellow cards:

 Red cards:

See also
 AFC Champions League
 2024–25 AFC Cup
 2022–23 Federation Cup (Bangladesh)
 2022–23 Independence Cup (Bangladesh)
 2022–23 Bangladesh Championship League
 2021–22 Bangladesh Women's Football League
 2021–22 BFF U-18 Football League
 2021-22 BFF U-16 Football Tournament

References

Bangladesh Football Premier League seasons
2022–23 in Asian association football leagues
2022 in Bangladeshi football
2023 in Bangladeshi football